William Samuel Viner (5 December 1881, in East Maitland, New South Wales – 27 March 1933, in Sydney) was an Australian chess master.

He was the West Australian champion in 1900, 1901, 1903 and 1905, and won the Perth Chess Club's handicap tournament three times. He also won four times Australian Chess Championship (1906, 1912, 1913, 1924) and once New Zealand Chess Championship in 1907.

References

 John van Manen, Viner, William Samuel (1881–1933), Australian Dictionary of Biography, Volume 12, Melbourne University Press, 1990, pp 329–330.

External links 
William S Viner chess games - 365Chess.com

1881 births
1933 deaths
Australian chess players